Bundahishn (Avestan: , "Primal Creation") is the name traditionally given to an encyclopedic collection of Zoroastrian cosmogony and cosmology written in Book Pahlavi. The original name of the work is not known.

Although the Bundahishn draws on the Avesta and develops ideas alluded to in those texts, it is not itself scripture. The content reflects Zoroastrian scripture, which, in turn, reflects both ancient Zoroastrian and pre-Zoroastrian beliefs. In some cases, the text alludes to contingencies of post-7th century Islam in Iran, and in yet other cases, such as the idea that the Moon is farther than the stars, it reiterates scripture even though science had, by then, determined otherwise.

Structure
The Bundahishn survives in two recensions: an Indian and an Iranian version. The shorter version was found in India and contains only 30 chapters, and is thus known as the Lesser Bundahishn, or Indian Bundahishn. A copy of this version was brought to Europe by Abraham Anquetil-Duperron in 1762. A longer version was brought to India from Iran by T.D. Anklesaria around 1870, and is thus known as the Greater Bundahishn or Iranian Bundahishn or just Bundahishn. The greater recension (the name of which is abbreviated GBd or just Bd) is about twice as long as the lesser (abbreviated IBd). It contains 36 chapters. The Bundahisn contains characteristics that fall under the rubric of different forms of classifications, including both as an encyclopedic text and as a text similar to midrash.

The traditionally given name seems to be an adoption of the sixth word from the first sentence of the younger of the two recensions. The older of the two recensions has a different first line, and the first translation of that version adopted the name Zand-Ākāsīh, meaning "Zand-knowing", from the first two words of its first sentence.

Most of the chapters of the compendium date to the 8th and 9th centuries, roughly contemporary with the oldest portions of the  Denkard, which is another significant text of the "Pahlavi" (i.e. Zoroastrian Middle Persian) collection. The later chapters are several centuries younger than the oldest ones. The oldest existing copy dates to the mid-16th century.

The two recensions derive from different manuscript traditions, and in the portions available in both sources, vary (slightly) in content. The greater recension is also the older of the two, and was dated by West to around 1540. The lesser recension dates from about 1734.

Traditionally, chapter-verse pointers are in Arabic numerals for the lesser recension, and Roman numerals for the greater recension. The two series' are not synchronous since the lesser recension was analyzed (by Duperron in 1771) before the extent of the greater recension was known. The chapter order is also different.

Content

The Bundahishn is the concise view of the Zoroastrianism's creation myth, and of the first battles of the forces of Ahura Mazda and Angra Mainyu for the hegemony of the world. According to the text, in the first 3,000 years of the cosmic year, Ahura Mazda created the Fravashis and conceived the idea of his would-be creation. He used the insensible and motionless Void as a weapon against Angra Mainyu, and at the end of that period, Angra Mainyu was forced to submission and fell into a stupor for the next 3,000 years. Taking advantage of Angra Mainyu's absence, Ahura Mazda created the Amesha Spentas (Bounteous Immortals), representing the primordial elements of the material world, and permeated his kingdom with Ard (Asha), "Truth" in order to prevent Angra Mainyu from destroying it. The Bundahishn finally recounts the creation of the primordial bovine, Ewagdad (Avestan Gavaevodata), and Keyumars (Avestan Keyumaretan), the primordial human.

Following MacKenzie, the following chapter names in quotation marks reflect the original titles. Those without quotation marks are summaries of chapters that have no title. The chapter/section numbering scheme is based on that of B.T. Anklesaria for the greater recension, and that of West for the lesser recension. The chapter numbers for the greater recension are in the first column and in Roman numerals, and the chapter numbers for the lesser recension are in the second column, and are noted in Arabic numerals and in parenthesis.

Zoroastrian astronomy
Excerpt from Chapter 2:- On the formation of the luminaries.

1. Ohrmazd produced illumination between the sky and the earth, the constellation stars and those also not of the constellations, then the moon, and afterwards the sun, as I shall relate.

2. First he produced the celestial sphere, and the constellation stars are assigned to it by him; especially these twelve whose names are Varak (the Lamb), Tora (the Bull), Do-patkar (the Two-figures or Gemini), Kalachang (the Crab), Sher (the Lion), Khushak (Virgo), Tarazhuk (the Balance), Gazdum (the Scorpion), Nimasp (the Centaur or Sagittarius), Vahik (Capricorn), Dul (the Water-pot), and Mahik (the Fish);

3. which, from their original creation, were divided into the twenty-eight subdivisions of the astronomers, of which the names are Padevar, Pesh-Parviz, Parviz, Paha, Avesar, Beshn, Rakhvad, Taraha, Avra, Nahn, Miyan, Avdem, Mashaha, Spur, Husru, Srob, Nur, Gel, Garafsha Varant, Gau, Goi, Muru, Bunda, Kahtsar, Vaht, Miyan, Kaht.

4. And all his original creations, residing in the world, are committed to them; so that when the destroyer arrives they overcome the adversary and their own persecution, and the creatures are saved from those adversities.

5. As a specimen of a warlike army, which is destined for battle, they have ordained every single constellation of those 6480 thousand small stars as assistance; and among those constellations four chieftains, appointed on the four sides, are leaders.

6. On the recommendation of those chieftains the many unnumbered stars are specially assigned to the various quarters and various places, as the united strength and appointed power of those constellations.

7. As it is said that Tishtar is the chieftain of the east, Sataves the chieftain of the west, Vanand the chieftain of the south, and Haptoring the chieftain of the north.

Translations 

 Domenico Agostini (ed), Samuel Thrope (trans), The Bundahišn: The Zoroastrian Book of Creation, Oxford University Press 2020

See also 
 Book of the Dove, a medieval Russian poem sharing striking similarities with the Bundahishn

References

Further reading

 
 
 .
 Kassock, Zeke J.V., (2013), The Greater Iranian Bundahishn: A Pahlavi Student's 2013 Guide, 
 A translation of the Iranian or Greater Bundahišn by Anklesaria, Behramgore Tehmuras (1956) at Avesta.org
 A modern transcription of the Indian Bundahishn in the original Pahlavi at TITUS
 An edition of the Indian Bundahishn in the original Pahlavi, with German translation, by Ferdinand Justi (1868) at the Internet Archive
 An edition of the Pahlavi text from 1908, edited by Ervad Tahmuras Dinshaji Anklesaria

External links
 The Bundahishn (HTML format)

Middle Persian literature
Zoroastrian texts
Persian encyclopedias